Cindy Yen (born as Cindy Wu ( on November 14, 1986) is a Taiwanese-American singer, songwriter, actress, composer and producer. She was the first artist to be signed to JR Yang and Jay Chou's company, JVR Music, in 2009, when the company was already 10 years old. In October 2009 she released her first self-titled album: Cindy Yen 袁詠琳. Her first single, "Sand Painting," a duet sung with Jay Chou and composed by Yen herself, became an instant success. Yen's music covers an array of styles ranging from R&B, soul, pop, and classical, to rock, acoustic folk, dance and hip-hop.

Background and early life 
Cindy Yen was born and raised in Houston, Texas, to a statistics lecturer father and a certified accountant mother. When she was 12 her parents divorced, and since then Yen was brought up solely by her mother in USA as her father returned to his alma mater, National Cheng Kung University, as a Statistics professor. The piano become Yen's "best friend," and she once stated during an interview that "without piano, there is no me. Piano is my other half, what makes me complete. Everything I bury inside my heart I let out when I play." Yen attended Bellaire High School near Houston, TX and in 2004, went on to study and graduated from The University of Texas at Austin where she double-majored in piano performance and broadcast journalism.

In 2015, Yen revealed on Facebook that in 2008, she auditioned for American Idol in Dallas, but was eliminated by Randy Jackson's deciding vote. She then won the title of Miss Chinatown Houston 2008 and continued to win the national title of Miss Chinatown USA 2009. In the fall of 2008, Yen moved to Taiwan with her self-made demo, aiming to become a recording artist.

During the first few days, Yen met many record companies but was repeatedly rejected by all. They told her that her music was too "Western" and not suitable for the Asian market. They also said her style of singing wasn't suitable for the Chinese language, because it was too R&B and soul. Finally, she became the first artist ever to sign to JR Yang and the Taiwanese pop star Jay Chou's company, JVR Music in February 2009.

Music career

2009–2010 "Sand Painting" 
Within eight months of signing, Yen released her debut single, "Sand Painting," a duet sung with Jay Chou and composed/produced by Yen. It was the first time Chou had ever sung a song not written by himself. "Sand Painting" became the number one downloaded ringtone in Taiwan. It reached the top on many Asian billboards and at KTV. Yen's debut album was listed under Top 10 on the G-Music charts and Rose Records for 5 consecutive weeks, and was the number one listened to album on Taiwan's KKBox Charts for 4 consecutive weeks. "Sand Painting" went on to place as one of China's most popular top ten hit songs of 2010, as ranked in China's 2010 Mandarin Web Original Composition Pop Music Charts. She later re-wrote the lyrics for its English version – "Another One Like You"

Yen became the featured girl in commercials for the Taiwan cell phone company, FarEasTone. Yen composed and sang the theme song "Do you see me" for FarEasTone advertisements, after Joanna Wang & Alisa Gao.

On October 30, 2009, Yen released her self-titled album "Cindy Yen".

Her debut album is mainly built upon R&B, with popular elements such as rock, hip-hop, and folk. Yen composed and produced her album, with some help with the lyrics from Vincent Fang & Nan Quan Mama’s Lara Veronin. The album also includes genres such as pop rock, hard metal and Latin hip-hop dance beats. Songs included "Stupid Fish," "Very Traveling Love," "Singing a Song Because of Longing," and "Dancing With Threat", as well as piano ballads like "I'm Sorry" and "That Year We Made a Wish Together".

Since her debut, Yen has opened her own mini-concert in Hong Kong and was on tour with Jay Chou's 2010 "The Era" Concert Tour as a regular guest performer.

2011–2012 "2 Be Different" 

Yen released her second album, '2 Be Different', on September 29, 2011. Like the first album, Yen wrote and produced all ten songs on her album, which included a new electronic dance single "陷阱" ("Trap") instead. The music video prompted a blogger on CPopAccess to compare her with Jolin Tsai.

Yen said in an interview with Singapore's Razor TV that her new album aimed to empower women. Following the release of "2 Be Different", Yen received Best Stylistic New Artist at the Beijing MTV Super Awards 2011. Yen also received Best Single of the Year for "Trap" and Best Stylistic Breakthrough Artist of the Year at the Beijing Music Awards 2012.

2015–2016 "Fight For Love" 
Yen released her third album 'Fight For Love' in 2015. In this album, she self-produced two of the music videos – "Come To Mami" & "Bad Boy".

2018 "This Moment EP"

2020 Collaboration with Della Ding 
She collaborate with Della Ding, Taiwanese singer from B'in Music for the first time and released a song named "I Want Me" (我要我).

Television and film 

Yen first made a special guest appearance in Jay Chou's television drama series Pandamen (熊貓人) in 2010 where she played herself as an international concert pianist champion. 
 
On July 5, 2011, Yen debut as a supporting actress in her first TV drama series in the network series 瑰寶1949 (Invaluable Treasure 1949) along with her good friend 賴雅妍 (Megan Lai) and 林佑威 (Yowei Lin). The TV series was nominated for 5 Golden Bell Awards including Best Male Actor, Best Female Actress, and Best Drama of the Year. Invaluable Treasure 1949 ended up winning Best Artistic Design and Best Sound Effects.

In January 2012, Yen finished filming her first full-length feature film called First Time (第一次) alongside actor Mark Chao (趙又廷) and Hong Kong model Angelababy. Yen also wrote two theme songs for the film, which can be found on the original soundtrack.  The First Time premiered in China, Taiwan, and Hong Kong on June 8, 2012, and received top box office charts in China.

In the Summer of 2020, Yen participated in a Chinese reality show called Sisters Who Make Waves (乘风破浪的姐姐). At first, she didn't feel confident about her ability to compete against the other contestants who she deemed were "more famous than her". However, she ended up receiving a lot of attention for her performances on the show. She played piano in the initial scoring stage, rapped for the first time in Chinese during the first performance, and playing the violin during the duet with New Pants before being eliminated after the fourth performance.

Philanthropy, voluntary work and community service 
In January 2010, Yen became TVBS' spokesperson for their "Lotus" charity event aimed at raising money for children. She said she hopes to open a music school or a music camp of some sort that can provide "financial-free" education for children and give them a chance to creatively express themselves through music.

In November 2010, Yen performed alongside Jay Chou and Will Pan at Soong Ching-ling's (also known as Madame Sun yat-sen) Charity Foundation event as part of the 2010 Deutsche Tourenwagen Masters season Shanghai Street Circuit in Pudong.  Together, the three artists donated ¥1,500,000 (US$250,000) for families residing in the eastern part of China.

In March 2011, Yen was a member of the "Fight and Smile" campaign dedicated to help fundraise money for Japan's tsunami crisis. Along with other Taiwanese artists, Yen sang in the song "Believe" (相信愛） and also performed "Hero" during the "Fight and Smile" fundraising program.

Starting in March 2012, Yen has been involved in Taiwans's 336 Charity, an organization aiming to provide education and awareness for autistic children and their families.

Discography 
Solo Albums:
 Cindy Yen 袁詠琳 (2009)
 First self-title album【Cindy】, 10 self-composed tracks
 2 be different (2011)
 Fight For Love (2015)
 The Moment EP (2018)

Other Released Singles:

 2020 TV Drama【The Little Nyonya】, Ending Theme "Impenetrable"
 2019 TV Drama【Yong-jiu Grocery Store】, Interlude song "I Believe"
 2019 COTTON USA Theme Song, Digital Single "Brave"
 2017 COTTON USA Theme Song, Digital Single "Fighting For Love"
 2016 COTTON USA Theme Song, Digital Single "I Love Myself"
 2016 TV Drama【Ice Fantasy】, Ending theme song "Heart"
 2016 TV Drama【Ice Fantasy】, Interlude song "Li Luo"
 2015 Third album【Fight For Love】, 8 self-composed tracks
 2014 Taichung Teddy Carnival, Theme Song "Fly Tonight"
 2014 PTS TV Life Story【Smile in the Dark】, Interlude Song "Love is Black & White"
 2014 TTV Drama【CHOCOLAT】, Interlude song "Is This Love?"
 2013 Master Kong (Tingyi) 3+2 Cookie Series TV Commercial, Theme Song
 2012 Fubon Culture & Educational Foundation Young Voice, Theme song
 2012 TTV Drama【In Between】, Theme song "In Between"
 2012 Movie【First Time】, Theme Song "Cry Like a Baby"
 2012 Movie【First Time】, Interlude song "Arrangement"
 2011 Second album【2 BE DIFFERENT】, 10 self-composed tracks
 2011 Taichung Municipal Da-Dun Junior High School, Theme song "Forest of Hopes"
 2011 PTS Drama【The Invaluable Treasure, 1949】, End title song "Dust"
 2011 PTS Drama【The Invaluable Treasure, 1949】, Interlude song "After Pain"
 2011 PTS Drama【The Invaluable Treasure, 1949】, Theme song "Invaluable Treasure"

Songs written & produced for other artists:
痛了才懂 (Understanding After Pain), performed by 浪花兄弟 (The Drifters)
哭得像小孩 (Cry Like A Child), performed by 趙又庭 (Mark Chao)

Awards and nominations

TV and film

References

External links

 Cindy’s Official China Blog 袁詠琳新浪微博

American musicians of Taiwanese descent
American women musicians of Chinese descent
Sony BMG artists
Living people
1986 births
Musicians from Houston
University of Texas at Austin College of Fine Arts alumni
21st-century Taiwanese women  singers
Moody College of Communication alumni
21st-century American women singers
21st-century American singers